Godefridus Adrianus Quirinus "Frits" Niessen (16 September 1936 – 23 October 2020) was a Dutch politician. He served in the House of Representatives for the Labour Party between 1977 and 1978 and once more from 1980 to 1994.

Life
Niessen was born in Raamsdonk on 16 September 1936. He was a primary school teacher in Raamsdonksveer from 1958 to 1963 and subsequently was a Dutch teacher at the HAVO in Dongen from 1963 to 1980.

Niessen became a member of the House of Representatives for the Labour Party on 6 October 1977 and served until 6 January 1978. He left the House after the formation of the First Van Agt cabinet, which saw Labour Party members from the Den Uyl cabinet return to seats in parliament. Niessen returned to the House on 27 August 1980 after Jan Pronk left. During his time in parliament he was the party spokesperson for interior and cultural affairs, but was also occupied with education issues. In 1985 he interpellated Minister Elco Brinkman about his refusal to have Hugo Brandt Corstius be given the P. C. Hooft Award. In 1989 he was influential in preventing the closure of the Institut Néerlandais in Paris. Niessen remained a member of the House until 17 May 1994.

Upon his departure from the commission in 2006 he was made a Commander in the Order of the Crown. In 2009 he became an honorary citizen of Geertruidenberg. He died on 23 October 2020 in Raamsdonksveer.

References

1936 births
2020 deaths
Labour Party (Netherlands) politicians
Members of the House of Representatives (Netherlands)
People from Geertruidenberg
Recipients of the Order of the Crown (Netherlands)